Charles Horwood (8 December 1839 – 7 January 1870) was an English cricketer. Horwood was a right-handed batsman who bowled right-arm roundarm, although his exact bowling style is not known. He was born at Berkhamsted, Hertfordshire.

Career
Horwood made his first-class debut for Sussex against Hampshire in 1864 at Day's Ground, Southampton. He made further first-class appearances for Sussex, one in 1864 in a return fixture against Hampshire at the Royal Brunswick Ground, Hove, and a second against Nottinghamshire at Trent Bridge in 1865. He was unsuccessful in his three matches, scoring 23 runs at an average of 7.66, with a high score of 12 not out.

He died at the Manor House at Broadwater, Sussex, on 7 January 1870.

References

External links
Charles Horwood at ESPNcricinfo
Charles Horwood at CricketArchive

1839 births
1870 deaths
People from Berkhamsted
English cricketers
Sussex cricketers
People from Broadwater, West Sussex